"Are You Hearing (What I Hear)?" is a single by the British group Level 42, that was released in 1982.

It was the first single to be released from the album, The Pursuit of Accidents and reached #49 in the UK charts in May 1982.

Charts

Personnel
Mark King - bass and lead vocals
Mike Lindup - keyboards and vocals
Boon Gould - guitars
Phil Gould - drums and vocals
Wally Badarou - keyboards

References

1982 singles
Level 42 songs
Songs written by Mark King (musician)
Songs written by Phil Gould (musician)
Songs written by Boon Gould
1982 songs
Polydor Records singles
Song recordings produced by Mike Vernon (record producer)